James Hamilton (died 1580) was a Scottish churchman who served as Bishop of Argyll both pre- and post-Reformation and as Sub-Dean of Glasgow.

Life

He was the illegitimate son of James Hamilton, 1st Earl of Arran. His natural brothers were James Hamilton, Duke of Châtellerault and John Hamilton, Archbishop of St Andrews.

His first ecclesiastical posts were as reader of Petty, Highland, then rector of Spott, East Lothian. He was nominated Archbishop of Glasgow by the crown's representative on 31 July 1547, but was rejected by the papacy in the summer of 1548 on the grounds of illegitimacy. Five years later, he receives a dispensation for his illegitimacy and appointed Bishop of Argyll on 14 July 1553, although it is not certain whether he was ever consecrated to the Episcopate. He also held, in commendam, the Sub-Deanery of Glasgow.

He became a protestant and sat as Bishop of Argyll in the Scottish Reformation Parliament which ratified the Confession of Faith in August 1560.

He died at Monkland on 6 January 1580 n.s. (1579 o.s.).

Family

He married Janet Murray (died before 1 October 1572) and they had three sons, William ( burgess first in Canongate then in Glasgow), Gavin, and Paul Hamilton of Coats (entitled "Captain of Arran").

References

  
  
 

1580 deaths
Bishops of Argyll
Year of birth unknown
Scottish bishops 1560–1638